Eugenio Gignous (4 August 1850 – 30 August 1906) was an Italian painter born in Milan.

Biography
The son of a silk merchant from Lyon, Gignous displayed a precocious talent for painting and enrolled at the Brera Academy of Fine Arts in 1864, attending the courses on landscape taught by Luigi Riccardi and then Gaetano Fasanotti. He came into contact with the Milanese Scapigliatura movement when still very young and formed a close friendship with Tranquillo Cremona. He began to focus exclusively on landscape in the 1870s, experimenting with painting en plein air and producing views of the Lombard and Piedmontese countryside that he showed at all the major national exhibitions. The late 1870s saw a more naturalistic approach to landscape painting under the influence of Francesco Filippini and Filippo Carcano, with whom Gignous went to paint on Lake Maggiore in 1879, thus inaugurating a thematic repertoire devoted primarily to views of the Verbano, Mottarone and Val d’Ossola. Some biographical notes written by the artist’s wife Matilde would appear to bear out the hypothesis of a trip to Paris in the company of Carcano in 1878 and attest to friendship with Vincenzo Vela, who was apparently his host on numerous occasions in Ligornetto. A recognised leader of the Lombard school of painting, he lived in Stresa (Verbania) and on the coast of Liguria from 1887 to 1906, with long stays in Venice. He died in 1906 in Stresa. The Venice Biennale held a retrospective exhibition of his work in 1907.

References
 Elena Lissoni, Eugenio Gignous, online catalogue Artgate by Fondazione Cariplo, 2010, CC BY-SA (source for the first revision of this article).

Other projects

19th-century Italian painters
19th-century Italian male artists
Italian male painters
20th-century Italian painters
20th-century Italian male artists
Painters from Milan
Brera Academy alumni
Scapigliatura Movement
Italian people of French descent
1850 births
1906 deaths